WMIX may refer to:

 WMIX (AM), a radio station (940 AM) licensed to Mount Vernon, Illinois, United States
 WMIX-FM, a radio station (94.1 FM) licensed to Mount Vernon, Illinois, United States
 WrestleMania IX, a professional wrestling pay-per-view event produced by the World Wrestling Federation